Gymnastics events have been staged at the Olympic Games since 1896, with women competing for the time at the 1928 Olympic Games,  where the team from the Netherlands won gold.

Gymnasts

Medalists

See also 

 Netherlands women's national gymnastics team

References

Netherlands
gymnasts
Olympic